Friedrich, Prince of Schwarzenberg (1800–1870) had an adventurous career as a soldier, and described his wanderings and campaigns in several interesting works, of which the best known is his Wanderungen eines Lanzknechtes (1844–1845).

Early life 
Born into an illustrious House of Schwarzenberg, he was the eldest son of the famous Field Marshal Karl Philipp, Prince of Schwarzenberg and his wife Countess Maria Anna von Hohenfeld (1768-1848), widowed Princess Esterhazy.

Biography  
He took part as an Austrian officer in the campaigns of Galicia 1846, Italy 1848 and Hungary 1848, and as an amateur in the French conquest of Algeria, the Carlist Wars in Spain and the Swiss civil war of the Sonderbund. He became a major-general in the Austrian army in 1849, and died after many years of well-filled leisure in 1870.

Friedrich was briefly engaged to Princess Elisa Radziwill, but the engagement was called off.

Sources 
ADB:Schwarzenberg, Friedrich Fürst zu (österreichischer General)

1800 births
1870 deaths
Military personnel of the First Carlist War
Schwarzenberg family